Broward County Transit (also known as BCT) is the public transit agency in Broward County, Florida. It is the second-largest transit system in Florida after Miami-Dade Transit. It currently operates the only public bus system in Broward County. Besides serving Broward County, It also serves portions of Palm Beach County and Miami-Dade County, where it overlaps its service with Miami-Dade Transit and Palm Tran.

Services
 Regular local Service: Broward County Transit's local service is focused mainly in Broward County. However, they operate routes traveling from Broward County to Palm Beach County, linking their service with Palm Tran.There are also routes that travel from Broward County to Miami-Dade County, linking their service with Miami-Dade Transit. 
 Limited-stop service: Known as The Breeze (separate from overall fleet theme), operates 4 routes, one via S.R. 7 (US 441)-(441 Breeze), another one via US-1 (US-1 Breeze), another one via University Dr (University Breeze), and the other via Broward Blvd (Broward Breeze).
 Paratransit and community bus service: Paratransit services are available for disabled riders and senior citizens. Community Buses operate special routes as an extension of the local bus service in Broward County. 
 95 Express: This is an express bus service that travels on Interstate 95 from Pembroke Pines and Miramar to downtown Miami. It only operates on weekdays and peak directions and costs an extra $0.65 ($0.30 for youth, senior, and disabled). It is primarily operated using  MCI D4500CT motor coaches.
 595 Express: This is an express bus service that travels on Interstate 595 from BB&T Center to downtown Miami. It only operates on weekdays and utilizes the same premium express fare as the 95 Express. Like the 95 Express, it is primarily operated using MCI D4500CT motor coaches.

Fleet

Since 2000, BCT has developed themed liveries for each new fleet order. The previous generation, introduced in the early 1980s, did not have a name.

Bee Line generation

The Bee Line generation was first introduced in 1997, replacing older high-floor buses decorated with a split orange and blue stripe around the side. These low-floor buses were painted white with a yellow honeycomb pattern stripe on all sides. A cartoon bee character was also placed on each bus, and was later removed.

The Breeze generation
The Breeze generation was introduced in 2007 for two special limited-stop service routes on US 1 and US 441/SR 7, traversing from northern Broward County to northern Miami-Dade County. BCT has now added 48  NABI 40-LFW buses to the fleet. BCT introduced six New Flyer D60LFR articulated buses for service on the US 441/SR 7 route. The new buses also feature free Wi-Fi to riders.

The Breeze generation 2007-2018 buses were originally painted in white with two blue arcs, one light and one dark. Later buses ordered and some of the older buses were painted in silver with two blue arcs, one light and one dark.

In 2008, BCT ordered 42 newly restyled  low-floor NABIs, including 12 hybrid buses.

Current Livery 
The current livery was introduced in 2020 as part of the half-penny tax, also known as Penny for Transportation. The livery consists of the front and sides of the buses being painted silver with an orange and white stripe running across the side of the bus with the back of the bus being painted blue. The Broward County colors of orange, yellow, and white are shown via diagonal stripes parallel to each other on the front and rear quarter panels off the bus.

This paint scheme was introduced on BCT's 147 2020 Gillig BRT buses.

Routes

Local service

The Breeze
The Breeze routes operate only weekdays, providing limited-stop service on corridors served by other local bus routes.

Express service
Express service traverse interstate highways, connecting park and ride locations in Broward County with Downtown Miami and Miami International Airport. These routes operate weekdays only.

See also
 Transportation in South Florida

References

External links
Official site
System Facts

Transportation in Broward County, Florida
Bus transportation in Florida
Transit agencies in Florida